Danko Herceg (born 30 August 1974 in Zagreb) is a Croatian slalom canoeist who competed at the international level from 1990 to 2010.

He was junior world champion in 1990 and he won a silver medal in the C1 team event at the 1995 ICF Canoe Slalom World Championships in Nottingham. He was ranked 3rd in the overall World Cup standings in 1994 and 1995. Herceg also competed in four Summer Olympics, earning his best finish of ninth in the C1 event in Barcelona in 1992.

World Cup individual podiums

References

1974 births
Canoeists at the 1992 Summer Olympics
Canoeists at the 1996 Summer Olympics
Canoeists at the 2000 Summer Olympics
Canoeists at the 2004 Summer Olympics
Croatian male canoeists
Living people
Olympic canoeists of Croatia
Medalists at the ICF Canoe Slalom World Championships